Abdullah Roaei Al-Mabrouk (born 1 July 1953) is a Saudi Arabian long-distance runner. He competed in the men's 5000 metres at the 1972 Summer Olympics.

References

1953 births
Living people
Athletes (track and field) at the 1972 Summer Olympics
Saudi Arabian male long-distance runners
Olympic athletes of Saudi Arabia
Place of birth missing (living people)